György Majláth (7 December 1818 – 29 March 1883), also known by his German name Georg von Majláth, was a Hungarian politician.

Majláth was born in Pressburg (Pozsony), Kingdom of Hungary (today Bratislava, Slovakia), to György Majláth, also a Hungarian politician. He entered the civil service of the county of Baranya, of which he was deputy from 1839 to 1843. The legislature appointed him administrator of the county in 1843, and county head in 1848. However he withdrew to private life during the Hungarian Revolution of 1848.

He reentered politics a decade later, playing a large part from 1859 in a strengthened legislature. In 1866 he became Chancellor of Hungary, and later the judex curiae (judge royal) of Hungary. He was Speaker of the Diet of Hungary from 22 March 1867 until his death on 29 March 1883. He was killed during a robbery in 1883.

References

1818 births
1883 deaths
Austro-Hungarian politicians
Hungarian jurists
Speakers of the House of Magnates
Judges royal
Hungarian murder victims
19th-century Hungarian politicians
Knights of the Golden Fleece of Austria
1883 murders in Europe